Brendan Place (born 13 December 1965, in Dublin) is an Irish former professional football player and manager.

Playing career
A central defender like his father, Brendan Place Sr., himself a colourful leading player on the League of Ireland scene, Brendan Jr. began his football career with the Dublin youth club Home Farm.

In 1983, he graduated to their senior team, then playing at the top level of domestic football in Ireland. He made his debut against Derry City at the Brandywell, in Derry's first game in the League of Ireland.

After catching the eye of cross channel scouts with his subsequent displays for Longford Town and Athlone Town, Place was signed by Damien Richardson for Gillingham on 21 October 1989. He made his debut two days later against Chesterfield, but a promising career with the English third division club was cut short when he incurred a serious neck injury, which kept out of the game for six years. He eventually recovered to full fitness and returned to his roots to play for Home Farm, playing at the time as Home Farm Everton. In his first season back he was awarded the club's Player of the Season. In the 2000s, after spells with Bohemians, Shelbourne, Home Farm Fingal and as player manager for Malahide United, he brought his playing career to an end.

Place then returned to the top tier of Irish domestic football at 37 years of age with Monaghan United.

Managing career
As a coach, he has a comprehensive background, starting as development coach with the LOI/ FAI Soccer Academy in Dublin between 1999 and 2002. As a part of that time he coached the Republic of Ireland U17 that finished third in Japan in August 2004 and went on to work with the Republic of Ireland U19 that qualified for the elite Stage of the UEFA championship in Cyprus later that year. He also spent three years as high performance coach with the Elite Irish women's squad and had a spell as player-coach with Bohemians reserve squad.

Having brought non-League Malahide United to promotion as player manager, Place was then appointed development youth coach for Home Farm Schoolboys before becoming player coach at Loughshinny Utd in 2005, bringing his team to the final of the Gilligan Cup.

In 2008, he took over as manager at Athlone Town. One of his first signings was his brother Stephen.

Place left in 2010 to concentrate on completing his UEFA pro licence. He already held a UEFA A licence and completed a sports psychology diploma. Place coached Crumlin United schoolboys and after a successful treble winning season at U16 level returned to Home Farm as head coach of U17s team for the 2012–13 season.

In 2013, Place was appointed head coach for Bohemians FC under 19s Eircom League.

A return to Eircom league followed for Place in 2015-16, with Tommy Dunne and newly promoted Galway United as opposition / match analysis scout.

In July 2016 Place was appointed U19s head coach at Hibernians FC .

Honours
League of Ireland First Division: 1
 Athlone Town; 1987–88
Leinster Senior Cup: 1
 Athlone Town; 1988
League of Ireland First Division: 1
 Home Farm Everton; 1997–98

References

1965 births
Living people
Republic of Ireland association footballers
Republic of Ireland expatriate association footballers
Republic of Ireland football managers
Association footballers from Dublin (city)
Home Farm F.C. players
Longford Town F.C. players
Athlone Town A.F.C. players
League of Ireland players
Gillingham F.C. players
English Football League players
Bohemian F.C. players
Monaghan United F.C. players
Shelbourne F.C. players
Athlone Town A.F.C. managers
League of Ireland managers
Association football defenders
Malahide United F.C. players